The Coca-Cola Bottling Plant (also known as the Coca-Cola Building and the Florida Coca-Cola Bottling Company) is an historic one-story redbrick building located at 517 North Main Street in Trenton, Gilchrist County, Florida. Built in 1925,  the building was listed in 1989 in A Guide to Florida's Historic Architecture, published by the University of Florida Press. It is the first Coca-Cola bottling plant built in Florida. At the time of its listing, it was "in disrepair and not in use."  Today it has been renovated and is being used by the Off The Beet Restaurant

References

External links
 Suwannee Valley Shoppes

Coca-Cola buildings and structures
Manufacturing plants in the United States
Industrial buildings completed in 1925